Matilda T. Durham, later Hoy (January 17, 1815 – July 30, 1901) was an American composer and hymn writer. She is remembered for her shape note tune "Promised Land", first published in 1835.

Biography
A native of Spartanburg County, South Carolina, Durham was the daughter of George Durham and Susan Hyde. She married Andrew Coan Hoy (1819–1890) in 1843; the ceremony was conducted by John Gill Landrum, who like her was a contributor to William Walker's Southern Harmony. She worked as a singing teacher, and in addition produced Baptist articles and tracts; these, though serious, displayed traces of wit as well. Durham moved to Cobb County, Georgia after the American Civil War, dying there and being buried in the Fowler-Hoy family cemetery. She had outlived her husband by nearly eleven years.

It has been posited that Durham was personally acquainted with Walker, who moved to the Spartanburg area around 1830; between 1835 and 1846 she contributed several tunes to his books. Besides "Promised Land", she is known for "Heavenly Treasure" and "Star of Columbia". She is often credited as "Miss M. T. Durham" or "M. Durham". Her talents as a composer and writer were once recorded as having been noted in her epitaph.

"Promised Land" has, since its publication, been adapted to a major key and, with an added refrain, become popular as a congregational hymn.

References

External links

1815 births
1901 deaths
People from Spartanburg County, South Carolina
People from Cobb County, Georgia
Songwriters from South Carolina
Songwriters from Georgia (U.S. state)
Shape note
American Christian hymnwriters
American women hymnwriters
19th-century American women musicians
19th-century American women writers
19th-century American composers
19th-century women composers